The Journal of Composite Materials is a peer-reviewed scientific journal that covers the field of materials science. Its editor-in-chief is H.Thomas Hahn (UCLA). It was established in 1967 and is published by SAGE Publications in association with the American Society for Composites.

Abstracting and indexing 
The journal is abstracted and indexed in Scopus and the Science Citation Index Expanded. According to the Journal Citation Reports, its 2020 impact factor is 2.591, ranking it 18th out of 28 journals in the category "Materials Science, Composites".

References

External links 
 
 American Society for Composites

SAGE Publishing academic journals
English-language journals
Materials science journals
Publications established in 1967